Justice Pierce may refer to:

Edward Pierce (Massachusetts judge) (1852–1938), associate justice of the Massachusetts Supreme Judicial Court
Randy G. Pierce (fl. 1980s–2010s), associate justice of the Supreme Court of Mississippi

See also
Judge Pierce (disambiguation)
Justice Pearce (disambiguation)